Vermont Translines is an intercity bus company founded by its parent company, charter bus company Premier Coach, in 2013. The bus company mainly serves the US Route 7 and US Route 4 corridors in the New England state of Vermont. Aided by $400,000 in annual federal grant money disbursed by the Vermont Agency of Transportation, the company also utilizes Greyhound's ticketing system and connects with other Greyhound bus routes, primarily in Burlington, Albany and White River Junction. Service on two routes between Burlington, Vermont and Albany, New York and between Rutland, Vermont and Dartmouth-Hitchcock Medical Center in Lebanon, New Hampshire officially began June 9, 2014, with intermediate stops at towns and cities between. The restart of intercity bus service for places like Rutland marked the first time some places along the current routes had seen any intercity bus service at all since Greyhound left Rutland in 2008, and in towns like Bennington since 2005.

In August 2017, an Amtrak Thruway bus service known as the Vermont Shires Connector commenced, with service between the Albany–Rensselaer Amtrak train station and Manchester, also stopping in Bennington in two places along the way. The route was terminated on July 19, 2021 when Vermont Translines resumed service following the COVID-19 pandemic. However, the Burlington-Albany route is also designated as an Amtrak Thruway service with a stop at Albany–Rensselaer, supplementing Amtrak's Ethan Allen Express service to Burlington.

All three routes run 365 days a year with one run in each direction per day. Trip planning for all routes are also available on Google Maps as of January 19, 2015.

Fleet 

Vermont Translines' current bus fleet consists of German bus manufacturer Setra coaches numbered 285, 286 and 287, and a Dodge bus numbered 1001. The much smaller Dodge bus is primarily used on the Route 4 bus route largely due to lower ridership on that route in the first fiscal year of the company's operation. The buses have Wi-Fi connections, and the three Setra buses have power outlet connections for portable electronic devices and restrooms available.

Livery and identity 

The company's buses have a mainly white color scheme, in conjunction with a combination of black, gold and green paint. Premier Coach's logo also appears in green on the back of the vehicles, as does Vermont Translines' website address. Drivers dress primarily in green and black uniforms.

Route detail

Burlington to Albany route

Rutland to Lebanon route (discontinued)

Vermont Shires Connector (discontinued)

References 

2013 establishments in the United States
American companies established in 2013
Companies based in Vermont
Intercity bus companies of the United States
Milton, Vermont